Fagesia is a small, subglobular ammonite (suborder Ammonitina) belonging to the vascoceratid family of the Acanthocerataceae that lived during the Turonian stage of the Late Cretaceous, 92-88 Ma ago.

The shell of Fagesia is about 9.5 cm (3.47 in) in diameter, typically with blunt umbilical tubercles from which spring 2 or three ribs each, but which are lost in the late growth stage. The suture is ammonitic with long spikey lobes and saddles with rounded subelements.

Species 
 †Fagesia catinus Mantell 1822 - Loma Gorda Formation, Colombia
 †Fagesia fleuryi Pervinquière 1907
 †Fagesia peroni Pervinquière 1907
 †Fagesia pervinquieri Bose 1920
 †Fagesia rudra Stoliczka 1865
 †Fagesia spheroidalis Pervinquière 1907
 †Fagesia superstes Kossmat 1897
 †Fagesia tevesthensis Peron 1896

Distribution 
Fossils of Fagesia have been found in Brazil, Colombia (El Colegio, Cundinamarca, La Frontera (Cundinamarca, Huila and Boyacá), and Loma Gorda Formations, Aipe, Huila), Egypt, France, Mexico, Morocco, Nigeria, Oman, Romania, the Russian Federation, Tunisia, United States (Arizona, California, Colorado, New Mexico, Texas), and Venezuela.

References

Bibliography

Further reading 
 

Ammonitida genera
Acanthoceratoidea
Cretaceous ammonites
Ammonites of Africa
Ammonites of Europe
Cretaceous France
Ammonites of North America
Cretaceous Mexico
Cretaceous United States
Ammonites of South America
Cretaceous Brazil
Cretaceous Colombia
Fossils of Colombia
Cretaceous Venezuela
Turonian life
Fossil taxa described in 1907